The Ambassador of Australia to the Federated States of Micronesia is an officer of the Australian Department of Foreign Affairs and Trade and the head of the Embassy of the Commonwealth of Australia to the Federated States of Micronesia. Australia first established diplomatic relations with the Federated States of Micronesia in 1987 and the Australian Embassy in Pohnpei was opened in November 1989. Prior to the establishment of the embassy, representative functions were carried out by the Consul-General residing in Honolulu. The current ambassador, since January 2016, is George Fraser.

List of ambassadors

References

 
Federated States of Micronesia
Australia